West Coast Blues! is a studio album by American tenor saxophonist Harold Land, released in 1960 by Jazzland label.

Reception

According to  Scott Yanow of All Music, who gave it a four-star review: "The music is as well-played and swinging as one would expect from this superior bop group."

Track listing
 "Ursula" (Harold Land) – 7:07
 "Klactoveedsedstene" (Charlie Parker) – 9:59
 "Don't Explain" (Arthur Herzog Jr., Billie Holiday) – 4:54
 "West Coast Blues" (Wes Montgomery) – 6:02
 "Terrain" (Land) – 7:46
 "Compulsion" (Land) – 6:48

Personnel
 Harold Land – tenor saxophone
 Wes Montgomery – guitar
 Joe Gordon – trumpet
 Barry Harris – piano
 Sam Jones – double bass
 Louis Hayes – drums

References

External reviews
[ AMG review: West Coast Blues!] 
 

1960 albums
Jazzland Records (1960) albums
Harold Land albums